Hymenophyllum refrondescens is a species of fern in the family Hymenophyllaceae. It is endemic to Ecuador.  Its natural habitat is subtropical or tropical moist lowland forests. It is threatened by habitat loss.

References

refrondescens
Ferns of Ecuador
Endemic flora of Ecuador
Ferns of the Americas
Data deficient plants
Taxonomy articles created by Polbot